Li Zijun (December 14, 1996) is a Chinese former competitive figure skater. She is the 2012 Winter Youth Olympic bronze medalist and the 2014 Four Continents bronze medalist. Li is also the 2017 Asian Winter Games silver medalist, 2010 JGP Final bronze medalist, and a four-time (2011–2014) Chinese national champion.

Career

2010–11 season: First senior national title 
Li debuted on the ISU Junior Grand Prix circuit during the 2010–11 season. She won the bronze medal in Austria and placed 4th in the Czech Republic to qualify for the Final. At the Junior Grand Prix Final, she tied with Risa Shoji for third place. She won the bronze medal on the tie-breaker.

Li went on to win her first senior national title. She finished 9th at the 2011 World Junior Championships.

2011–12 season: Bronze at Youth Olympics 
Li placed second in both of her assigned 2011–12 Junior Grand Prix events and qualified for the Junior Grand Prix Final which was held in Quebec City, Canada. She finished fourth at the event. At the Youth Olympics, she won the bronze medal. She then competed at the 2012 Junior World Championships and finished 5th. Concluding her season, Li won gold at her first senior international, the Triglav Trophy.

2012–13 season: Senior ISU Championship debut 
In the 2012–13 season, Li debuted on the senior Grand Prix series. She was fifth at her first event, the 2012 Cup of China, and 4th at the 2012 NHK Trophy, where she posted a personal best score of 174.11 points. Li won her third national title at the 2013 Chinese Championships. She then competed at the 2013 Four Continents Championships and finished 5th. She finished seventh at Worlds after placing twelfth in the short program and fourth in the long. She received the second highest technical score in the free skate, only after Kim Yuna.

2013–14 season: Bronze at Four Continents 
In the 2013–14 ISU Grand Prix season, Li's first event was the 2013 Cup of China where she finished 10th. Prior to her next Grand Prix assignment, the 2013 NHK Trophy, her coach Li Mingzhu stated, "She's getting taller and bigger, but losing power and coordination" and said it was affecting her self-confidence. The skater withdrew from the NHK Trophy, which was scheduled for the following week. She returned to competition at the 2014 Four Continents Championships, placing 2nd in the short, 3rd in the long and won the bronze medal overall behind gold medalist winner Kanako Murakami, and second-place finisher Satoko Miyahara. Li then competed at the 2014 Winter Olympics in Sochi, Russia where she finished 14th. At the 2014 World Championships, Li finished 17th overall.

2014–15 season
After the 2013–14 season, Li's head coach Li Mingzhu's contract to coach young Chinese skate for the 2014 Olympics ended and she moved back to the United States, while Li remained in China. In October, Gao Haijun became Li's new coach.

Li finished 6th at the 2014 Cup of China, after placing 5th in the short program and 6th in the free skate. At the 2014 NHK Trophy, she placed fifth in the short, eighth in the free, and seventh overall. She went on to win her fourth national title at the Chinese Championships, placing first by over 25 points.

At the 2015 Four Continents, Li finished 5th after placing 5th in the short program and 4th in the free skate, 1.52 points back of third place. At the 2015 World Championships in Shanghai where she placed 6th in the short program and 11th in the free skate to finish 9th overall. At the 2015 World Team Trophy, she placed 7th in the individual event and Team China placed 5th overall.

2015–16 season
For the 2015–16 Grand Prix series, Li was assigned to compete at 2015 Cup of China and 2015 NHK Trophy. She placed 9th in China and 7th in Japan.

She finished 10th at the 2016 Four Continents Championships in Taipei and 11th at the 2016 World Championships in Boston.

2016–17 season 
Ahead of the 2016–17 season, Li returned to train under Li Mingzhu in Artesia, California, and under Pang Qing. She later spent time training with Alexei Mishin in Saint Petersburg, Russia, and with Gao Haijun in Changchun, China.

Programs

Competitive highlights

GP: Grand Prix; JGP: Junior Grand Prix

Detailed results

Small medals for short program and free skating awarded only at ISU Championships.

Junior level

 QR = Qualifying round
 Personal bests highlighted in bold.

References

External links 

 

1996 births
Living people
Chinese female single skaters
Figure skaters from Changchun
Four Continents Figure Skating Championships medalists
Figure skaters at the 2014 Winter Olympics
Olympic figure skaters of China
Figure skaters at the 2012 Winter Youth Olympics
Figure skaters at the 2017 Asian Winter Games
Medalists at the 2017 Asian Winter Games
Asian Games silver medalists for China
Asian Games medalists in figure skating
20th-century Chinese women
21st-century Chinese women